Shanola Hampton (born May 27, 1977) is an American actress best known for her role as Veronica Fisher on Showtime dramedy Shameless and as the face model of Rochelle in the video game Left 4 Dead 2.

Acting career

2000–2010: Early career
Hampton played a part in "The Gift", a musical at Tiffany Theater in Hollywood in 2000.

Hampton appeared in several television series, such as Shameless, Reba, Popular, Scrubs, Criminal Minds, Related, and Miami Medical. She has also had roles in the movies: The Mostly Unfabulous Social Life of Ethan Green,  The Hanged Man, Christmas in the City, and You Again.

She was the face model for Rochelle in the video game Left 4 Dead 2.

Hampton graduated from Winthrop University with a degree in theater. While studying acting at the University of Illinois at Urbana–Champaign, Hampton worked at Goose Island Brewery in Wrigleyville. Hampton earned a Masters of Fine Arts in acting.

2011–present
In Summer 2010, Hampton was cast as a series regular on the Showtime dramedy Shameless as Veronica Fisher, a role for which she has received critical acclaim.

In 2013, Hampton co-starred in the movie Things Never Said. Hampton played a woman who tries to find the strength to leave her physically abusive husband. The movie was part of the Annual American Black Film Festival, the North Carolina Black Film Festival, Roxbury International Film Festival, the Greater Cleveland Urban Film Festival, the Black Star Film Festival, and the Laguna Film Festival. She signed a deal with NBCUniversal via Universal Television more recently.

Personal life
Hampton was born in Summerville, South Carolina. Hampton attended Summerville High School.

Hampton has been married to producer Daren Dukes since March 2000.  The couple have a daughter named Cai MyAnna Dukes (born January 2014) and a son named Daren O.C. Dukes (born May 2016).

Filmography

Film

Television

Video games

Awards and nominations

References

External links 

 
 

1977 births
Living people
African-American actresses
People from Long Island
People from Summerville, South Carolina
American television actresses
Actresses from South Carolina
Winthrop University alumni
21st-century African-American people
21st-century African-American women
20th-century African-American people
20th-century African-American women